The Uzbek telephone numbering plan describes the allocation of telephone numbers in Uzbekistan.

International dialling format (country code + area code + subscriber number): e.g. +998 BC XXXXXXX

Format
All Uzbek phone numbers have nine digits, and are composed of a city prefix (from 2 to 4 digits) and a subscriber number (the remaining digits up to 9).

City codes

Sources
 Ministry of Foreign Affairs of the Republic of Uzbekistan
 Cell phone info on Uzbekistan

References

ITU allocations list

Uzbekistan
Communications in Uzbekistan
Telephone numbers